This timeline of events leading to the American Civil War is a chronologically ordered list of events and issues that historians recognize as origins and causes of the American Civil War. These events are roughly divided into two periods: the first encompasses the gradual build-up over many decades of the numerous social, economic, and political issues that ultimately contributed to the war's outbreak, and the second encompasses the five-month span following the election of Abraham Lincoln as President of the United States in 1860 and culminating in the capture of Fort Sumter in April 1861.

Scholars have identified many different causes for the war. Among the most polarizing of the underlying issues from which the proximate causes developed was whether the institution of slavery should be retained and even expanded to other territories or whether it should be contained, which would lead to its ultimate extinction. Since the early colonial period, slavery had played a major role in the socioeconomic system of British America and was widespread in the Thirteen Colonies at the time of the American Declaration of Independence in 1776. During and after the American Revolution, events and statements by politicians and others brought forth differences, tensions and divisions between citizens of the slave states of the Southern United States and citizens of the free states of the Northern United States (including several newly admitted Western states) over the topics of slavery. In the many decades between the Revolutionary War and the Civil War, such divisions became increasingly irreconcilable and contentious.

Events in the 1850s culminated with the election of the anti-slavery Republican Abraham Lincoln as president on November 6, 1860. This provoked the first round of state secession as leaders of the cotton states of the Deep South were unwilling to remain in what they perceived as a second-class political status, with their way of life now threatened by the President himself. Initially, seven states seceded: Alabama, Florida, Georgia, Louisiana, Mississippi, South Carolina and Texas. After the Confederates attacked and captured Fort Sumter, President Lincoln called for volunteers to march south and suppress the rebellion. This pushed four other states in the Upper South (Virginia, North Carolina, Tennessee and Arkansas) also to secede, completing the incorporation of the Confederate States of America by July 1861. Their contributions of territory and soldiers to the Confederacy ensured, in retrospect, that the war would be prolonged and bloody.

Colonial period, 1607–1775

American Revolution and Confederation period, 1776–1787

Early Constitutional period, 1787–1811

1812–1849

Compromise of 1850 to the Election of 1860

Election of 1860 to the Battle of Fort Sumter

Further secessions and divisions

 Additional events related to secession and initiation of the war follow; most other events after April 15 are not listed.

Several small skirmishes and battles as well as bloody riots in St. Louis and Baltimore took place in the early months of the war. The Battle of First Bull Run or Battle of First Manassas, the first major battle of the war, occurred on July 21, 1861. After that, it became clear that there could be no compromise between the Union and the seceding states and that a long and bloody war could not be avoided. All hope of a settlement short of a catastrophic war was lost.

See also

 Issues of the American Civil War
 Battles of the American Civil War
 Origins of the American Civil War
 Slavery in the United States
 Timeline of the civil rights movement
 Bibliography of the American Civil War
 Bibliography of Abraham Lincoln
 Bibliography of Ulysses S. Grant

References

Bibliography

 Adams, Gretchen A. Weld, Theodore Dwight. pp. 2086–2087.
 Allen, W. B., and John Clement Fitzpatrick, eds, George Washington: A Collection, Indianapolis: Library Classics, 1989. .
 Blake, William O. History of Slavery and the Slave Trade, Ancient and Modern. Columbus, Ohio: H. Miller, 1861. . Retrieved April 3, 2011.
 Bateman, Newton, Paul Selby and Charles Addison Partridge, eds. Historical encyclopedia of Illinois. Chicago: Munsell Publishing Company, 1903. . Retrieved April 1, 2011.
 Billings, Warren The Old Dominion in the Seventeenth Century: A Documentary History of Virginia, 1606–1700. Chapel Hill: Published for the Omohundro Institute of Early American History and Culture, Williamsburg, Virginia, by the University of North Carolina Press, 2007 (2009). .
 Bowman, John S., ed. The Civil War Almanac. New York: Facts on File, Bison Book Corp., 1982. .
 Briley, Ronald F. The Study Guide Amistad: A Lasting Legacy, In History Teacher Vol. 31, No. 3 (May 1998), pp. 390–394 in JSTOR
 Cluskey, ed., Michael W. Political Text-Book or Encyclopedia Containing Everything Necessary for the Reference of Politicians and Statesmen of the United States. Washington, D.C.: Cornelius Wendell, 1857. .
 Crowther, Edward R. Abolitionists. pp. 6–7 in Encyclopedia of the American Civil War: A Political, Social, and Military History, edited by David S. Heidler and Jeanne T. Heidler. New York: W. W. Norton & Company, 2000. .
 Davis, Thomas J. "The New York Slave Conspiracy of 1741 as Black Protest." In Journal of Negro History Vol. 56, No. 1 (January 1971), pp. 17–30 in JSTOR
 Del Lago, Enrico. Abolitionist Movement. pp. 3–6 in Encyclopedia of the American Civil War: A Political, Social, and Military History, edited by David S. Heidler and Jeanne T. Heidler. New York: W. W. Norton & Company, 2000. .
 Dowdey, Clifford. The Virginia Dynasties. Boston: Little, Brown & Company, 1969. .
 Du Bois, W. E. B. The Suppression of the Slave Trade to the United States of America (1904) online edition
 Egerton, Douglas R. Gabriel's Conspiracy and the Election of 1800. In Journal of Southern History Vol. 56, No. 2 (May 1990), pp. 191–214 in JSTOR
 Eicher, David J. The Longest Night: A Military History of the Civil War. New York: Simon & Schuster, 2001. .
 Engs, Robert Francis. Slavery during the Civil War. In The Confederacy edited by Richard N. Current. New York: Simon and Schuster Macmillan, 1993. .
 Faust, Patricia L. "DeBow's Review". In Historical Times Illustrated History of the Civil War, edited by Patricia L. Faust. New York: Harper & Row, 1986. . pp. 212–213.
 Foner, Philip Sheldon and Robert J. Branham. Lift every voice: African American oratory, 1787–1900. Tuscaloosa, AL: University of Alabama Press, 1998. . Retrieved May 29, 2011.
 Gara, Larry. slavery. In Historical Times Illustrated History of the Civil War, edited by Patricia L. Faust. New York: Harper & Row, 1986. . pp. 691–692
 Hansen, Harry. The Civil War: A History. New York: Bonanza Books, 1961. .
 Heidler, David S., and Jeanne T. Heidler, eds. Encyclopedia of the American Civil War: A Political, Social, and Military History (5 vols. W. W. Norton, 2000). .
 Kiefer, Joseph Warren. Slavery and Four Years of War: A Political History of Slavery in the United States Together with a Narrative of the Campaigns and Battles of the Civil War in Which the Author Took Part: 1861–1865, vol. 1. New York: G. Putnam's Sons, 1900. . Retrieved March 8, 2011.
 Klein, Maury. Days of Defiance: Sumter, Secession, and the Coming of the Civil War. New York: Alfred A. Knopf, 1997. .
 Kolchin, Peter. American Slavery: 1619–1877, New York: Hill and Wang, 1994. .
 Levy, Andrew. The First Emancipator: The Forgotten Story of Robert Carter, the Founding Father who freed his slaves. New York: Random House, 2005. .
 Lepore, Jill. New York Burning: Liberty, Slavery, and Conspiracy in Eighteenth-Century Manhattan. New York: Alfred A. Knopf, 2005, 2006. .
 Long, E. B. The Civil War Day by Day: An Almanac, 1861–1865. Garden City, NY: Doubleday, 1971. .
 Malone, Dumas. Jefferson and His Time: Volume Six, The Sage of Monticello. Boston: Little Brown and Company, 1981. .
 McCartney, Martha W. A Study of Africans and African Americans on Jamestown Island and at Green Spring, 1619–1803. Williamsburg, VA: National Park Service and Colonial Williamsburg Foundation, 2003. Retrieved May 28, 2011.
 McPherson, James M. Battle Cry of Freedom: The Civil War Era. Oxford History of the United States. New York: Oxford University Press, 1988. .
 McPherson, James M. Ordeal By Fire: The Civil War and Reconstruction. New York: Alfred A. Knopf, 1982. .
 Miller, Randall M. and John David Smith, eds. Dictionary of Afro-American Slavery. New York; London: Greenwood, 1988. .
 Miller, William Lee. Arguing About Slavery: John Quincy Adams and the Great Battle in the United States Congress. New York: Alfred A. Knopf, 1995. .
 Morris, Richard B. Encyclopedia of American History (7th edn 1996).
 Nevins, Allan. Ordeal of the Union (8 vols 1947–70). New York: Charles Scribner's Sons, 1947–1970. .
 Pogue, Dennis J., Ph.D. (Spring/Summer 2003). George Washington And The Politics of Slavery. In Historic Alexandria Quarterly. Office of Historic Alexandria (Virginia). Retrieved January 3, 2011.
 Potter, David M. completed and edited by Don E. Fehrenbacher The Impending Crisis: America Before the Civil War, 1848–1861. New York: Harper Perennial, reprint 2011. First published New York, Harper Colophon, 1976. .
 Rubin, Louis, D. Virginia, a History. New York, W. W. Norton & Company, Inc, 1977. .
 Russell, John Henderson. The free Negro in Virginia, 1619–1865 (1913).
 Santoro, Nicholas. Atlas of Slavery and Civil Rights: An Annotated Chronicle of the Passage from Slavery and Segregation to Civil Rights and Equality under the Law (iUniverse, 2006) ;
 Schlesinger Jr., Arther M., ed. The Almanac Of American History. New York: Putnam, 1983. .
 Schott, Thomas E. Cornerstone Speech. In The Confederacy edited by Richard N. Current. New York: Simon and Schuster Macmillan, 1993. . pp. 298–299.
 Stroud, George M. A Sketch of the Laws Relating to Slavery in the Several States of the United States of America. Philadelphia: Henry Longstreth, 1856 .
 Swanberg, W. A., First Blood: The story of Fort Sumter. New York: Charles Scribner's Sons, 1957. .
 Tise, Larry E. Proslavery. In The Confederacy edited by Richard N. Current. New York: Simon and Schuster Macmillan, 1993. . p. 866.
 Varon, Elizabeth R. Disunion!: the coming of the American Civil War, 1789–1859. Chapel Hill: University of North Carolina Press, 2008. .
 Wagner, Margaret E., Gary W. Gallagher, and Paul Finkelman. The Library of Congress Civil War Desk Reference. New York: Simon & Schuster Paperbacks, Inc., 2009 edition. . First published 2002.
 Watkins, Jr., William J. Reclaiming the American Revolution: the Kentucky and Virginia Resolutions and Their Legacy. New York: Palgrave MacMillan, 2004. . Retrieved May 29, 2011.
 Wilson, Henry. History of the Rise and Fall of the Slave Power in America. 3 volumes. Volume 1. Boston: James R. Osgood and Company, 1872. . Retrieved April 13, 2011.

Civil War
18th century in the United States
19th century in the United States
American Civil War timelines
American Civil War-related lists
American Civil War, Timeline of events leading to the